ワ -come on- is Lee Jung Hyun's Japanese mini album. The CD contains seven tracks, all of which were previously Korean hits. The versions found on ワ -come on- have different lyrics, as well as they are in a different language, and the songs are arranged differently. The DVD, which contains the PVs for ワ -come on-, Heaven and Heavy world, was notorious for having extremely low quality. This EP reached #38 in the Oricon Weekly Charts.

Track listing

CD
 ワ -come on- (Wa -come on-; Come -come on-)
 DaTo ～パックォ～ (DaTo ～Ba Kkwo～; DaTo ～Change～)
 GX 339-4
 夢 (Yume; Dream)
 Heaven
 ワ -come on- (Remix) (Wa -come on- (Remix); Come -come on- (Remix))
 DaTo ～パックォ～(Remix) (DaTo ～Ba Kkwo~ (Remix); DaTo ～Change～ (Remix))

DVD
 ワ -come on- (PV) (Wa -come on- (PV); Come -come on- (PV))(Korean Version)
 Heaven (PV)（Japanese Live)
 BaKkwo～ (PV)(Korean Version)

Lee Jung-hyun albums
2005 EPs
2005 compilation albums
Music video compilation albums
2005 video albums